Mikhail Vartanov (b. February 21, 1937, RSFSR, Soviet Union, now Russian Federation, d. December 31, 2009, Hollywood, California) was a Soviet cinematographer who made significant contribution to world cinema with the documentary films Parajanov: The Last Spring and Seasons.

He is considered an important cinematographer and documentarian of his generation, noted for artistic collaborations with Sergei Parajanov and such influential documentary films as Parajanov: The Last Spring, The Seasons (directed by Artavazd Peleshyan), The Color of Armenian Land, and a series of essays including The Unmailed Letters.

Early career
Vartanov's debut film, The Color of Armenian Land, marked the beginning of his trademark style, afterwards dubbed as the "direction of undirected action." This documentary, featuring a stylized silent commentary by painter Martiros Saryan, also featured Vartanov's friends, the dissident artists Minas Avetisyan and Sergei Parajanov. Due to this the film was censored and suppressed; leading up to Avetisyan's assassination and Parajanov's imprisonment shortly after.

Friendship with Sergei Parajanov and the blacklist
Mikhail Vartanov had a close relationship with imprisoned director Sergei Parajanov. He was first acquainted with Parajanov's work in 1964, having watched the latter's film Shadows of Forgotten Ancestors and the test footage of the unfinished Kiev Frescoes as a student at Moscow’s Gerasimov Institute of Cinematography. Their lifelong friendship began after they met for the first time in 1967, in Armenia, and discussed the screenplay of The Color of Pomegranates (also known as Sayat Nova).

Vartanov's next film Autumn Pastoral—written by Artavazd Peleshyan and scored by composer Tigran Mansurian—was shelved. After Sergei Parajanov was arrested in Kiev in 1973, Vartanov immediately protested to the Prosecutor General of Ukraine. The recently declassified document proved that it was that letter in support of Parajanov that prompted the intensified harassment that Vartanov endured, and his subsequent firing from the Armenfilm Studios 4 months after Paradjanov's imprisonment. In a letter from prison, Parajanov wrote to Vartanov: "You and your purity are colliding with circumstances and predators… That's life."

Cinematographer
Peleshyan and Gennadi Melkonian petitioned the Soviet Russian and Armenian authorities to work with Vartanov, who was by this time blacklisted and unemployed, and he was eventually allowed to participate as a cinematographer in two essay films: The Seasons (also translated as The Seasons of the Year, 1975) and The Mulberry Tree (1979).

Essayist
After a 9-year absence from directing, Vartanov was asked to save a troubled project, The Roots (1983) which he later wrote was "the best film made in Armenia that year." During this period he also worked as a university professor of cinema and photography, while publishing his writings. They appeared in several languages, including French, in Cahiers du cinéma.

Later career
For over 20 years, Vartanov's films had been largely suppressed, unmentioned by press, or blocked from submission to foreign film festivals. In a letter to the imprisoned Parajanov, Vartanov wrote, quoting his favorite poet Boris Pasternak: "the time will come and the power of meanness and malice would be overcome by the spirit of kindness." Parajanov responded to Vartanov: "Dear Misha, I received your amazing letter... Never have you been more accurate in evaluating the world and expressing yourself...".

Mikhail Vartanov's last documentary trilogy consisted of Erased Faces (1987), Minas: A Requiem (1989), and the influential film Parajanov: The Last Spring (1992) made in a war-torn, blockaded Armenia during the First Nagorno-Karabakh War.

Quotes
"In our land, the government manufactures the biography of the Artist. It honors and awards one, for nothing, and it dishonors and imprisons the other -- a wise government -- it desires to turn both into obedient slaves."

"Probably, besides the film language suggested by Griffith and Eisenstein, the world cinema has not discovered anything revolutionarily new until the 'Color of Pomegranates,' not counting the generally unaccepted language of the 'Andalusian Dog' by Bunuel."

Quotes about Vartanov
Vartanov's film Parajanov: The Last Spring [...] exemplifies the power of art over any limitations." (Francis Ford Coppola)Hollywood Reporter Mikhail Vartanov 
"Vartanov [...] Brother and friend in arts and in soil... Dear, beloved, rare and wonderful. Perhaps, you're the only friend, who compels me to live... You possess everything an artist needs -- mind, kindness, principles, freedom. Create... That's your mission." (Sergei Parajanov, 1974)
"Vartanov - the Eyemoman [...]" (William Saroyan, 1978)
"My dear friend [...] If you like the screenplay (Desert), together we could make a masterpiece [...]" (Artavazd Peleshyan, 1980s)
"On January 9, came Vartanov [...] Parajanov's most devoted man [...] an amazing man [...] gave an amazing speech [...]" (Gayane Khachatryan, 1990)
"Vartanov's film [...] Excited and filled me with strength [...]" (Tonino Guerra, 1993)
"Vartanov was an amazing intellectual, perhaps one of the last [...]" (Yuri Mechitov, 2010)
"Misha Vartanov [...] One of the most principled and righteous men I have ever met [...]" (Roman Balayan, 2010)
"We have to ensure that the work of seminal artists like Mikhail Vartanov is preserved, promoted and accessible to the widest possible audience. His films, made against all odds and under the harshest conditions, are crucial to the important heritage of world cinema." (Agnieszka Holland)
"Vartanov made a wonderful film Parajanov: The Last Spring [...]" (Martin Scorsese)

Awards and honors
 Golden Antelope Award (for diploma film, The Monologue of the Mask) Dakar, 1965.
 Cinematographer of the Year (for The Song of Eternity), USSR Film Festival, 1973
 Russian Academy of Cinema Arts Award (for Parajanov: The Last Spring), Moscow, 1993
 Golden Gate Award (for Parajanov: The Last Spring), San Francisco International Film Festival, 1995
 Golden Palm Award (for Parajanov: The Last Spring''), Beverly Hills Film Festival, 2003
 A film retrospective and an art exhibition, Busan International Film Festival, Korea, 2012
 A film retrospective at the Copenhagen Cinematheque, Denmark, 2020

Legacy

Parajanov-Vartanov Institute was established in Hollywood in 2010 to study, preserve and promote the artistic legacies of Sergei Parajanov and Mikhail Vartanov.

Filmography

References

Selected bibliography

English language sources

Dixon, Wheeler & Foster, Gwendolyn. "A Short History of Film." New Brunswick, NJ: Rutgers University Press, 2008. 
Rollberg, Peter. "Historical Dictionary of Russian and Soviet Cinema." Scarecrow Press, 2008. 
Schneider, Steven Jay. "501 Movie Directors." London: Hachette/Cassell, 2007. 
"Francis Ford Coppola Recognizes…" Hollywood Reporter (20 October 2015)
Thomas, Kevin. "Intoxicating spirit." "Los Angeles Times" (1 January 2004)
Kaplan, Ilyse. "Beverly Hills Film Festival." Variety, (7 April 2011)

Foreign language sources

 Abramov, G. "Ancient art, alive forever" Pravda newspaper, Moscow, 20 April 1966
 "Il Cinema Delle Repubbliche Transcaucasiche Sovietiche." Venice, Italy: Marsilio Editori, 1986. (Italian language) 
 "Les Cimes du Monde." Cahiers du Cinéma" no. 381 (1986), 42-47 (French language) 
 Krukova, A. "Russian Oscars were awarded in Moscow" Independent Newspaper, Moscow, 21 December 1992
 Badasian, V. " "Approaching spirituality"  Republic of Armenia newspaper, 25 June 1993
 Perreault, Luc. "Paradjanov - The Last Spring" La Presse, a12, 14 Juin 1994 (French language)
 Tremblay, Odile. "L'empire du pape du pop" Le Devoir, b8, 14 Juin 1994 (French language)
 Stolina, G. "Larger than legends" Panorama newspaper, Hollywood, 14 January 2004
 Egiazarian, R. "Mishel Vartanov from former USSR" Novoye Vremya newspaper, Yerevan, 4 June 2005
 "Director Martin Scorsese accepts 2014 Parajanov-Vartanov Institute Award" California Courier, Los Angeles, p1, 13 October 2014
 Schneider, Steven Jay. "501 Directores de Cine." Barcelona, Spain: Grijalbo, 2008. (Spanish language)

External links 
Mikhail Vartanov Parajanov.com 
Hollywood Reporter Francis Ford Coppola on Vartanov
Deadline

Condestable Palace exhibition, Spain
Variety
IDFA International Documentary Festival Amsterdam
Busan International Film Festival
 Memories of an actress
 Memories of Marco Mueller
 Actress Topchyan on Parajanov and Vartanov
LA Weekly 2011
LA Weekly 2019
Hollywood Reporter
Screen International
FIPRESCI
Channel 1 Moscow - This is Cinema TV Show on Sergei Parajanov and Mikhail Vartanov
Facebook
Twitter
Instagram

Russian film directors
Russian people of Armenian descent
1937 births
2009 deaths
Gerasimov Institute of Cinematography alumni
Soviet film directors
Armenian film directors
Armenian documentary filmmakers
Armenian screenwriters
Recipients of the Nika Award
Armenian documentary film directors
Soviet cinematographers
20th-century screenwriters